"Yo (Excuse Me Miss)" is a song recorded by American singer Chris Brown. It served as the second single from Brown's debut album Chris Brown (2005) and was released in November 2005 in the US and February 2006 worldwide. "Yo (Excuse Me Miss)", produced by Dre & Vidal, became Brown's second top ten single in the United States, peaking at number seven on the US Billboard Hot 100.

It features Dre (André Meritt) who sings the chorus' background vocals.

This song has appeared on the videogame Dance Dance Revolution Hottest Party.

Music video 
In the music video, directed by Erik White, it features then-model Erica Mena as a girl Brown sees that catches his attention.  He then follows the girls while dancing. After arriving at a basketball court, he begins to dance with two other guys. Brown then gets inside a car with the girl and sings to her. They get close, then she  gives him her phone to put his number in. He soon dances on a car and at the end of the video he begins to dance with a crowd of people. The video features the first verse of "Gimme That" at the end. Lil' JJ, Trey Songz, and DeRay Davis make cameo appearances in the video. The video made a reference to Michael Jackson's 1987 hit single "The Way You Make Me Feel".

Live performance
On April 1, 2006, Chris Brown performed "Yo (Excuse Me Miss)" at the 2006 Kids' Choice Awards as part of a musical duel with rapper Bow Wow that was inspired by the 1986 Run-D.M.C. music video "Walk This Way".

Chart performance
Yo (Excuse Me Miss) peaked at number seven on the US Billboard Hot 100 on February 18, 2006. This became Brown's second top-ten song on the chart. The song spent a total of 21 weeks on the chart. On December 12, 2007, the single was certified platinum by the Recording Industry Association of America (RIAA) for sales of over a million copies in the United States.
In other countries, the song reached number thirteen in the United Kingdom and number ten in Australia.

Remixes
Yo (Excuse Me Miss) [DJ Dime Remix]
Yo (Excuse Me Miss) [Remix] (featuring Busta Rhymes & Labba)
Yo (Excuse Me Miss) [Remix] (featuring Red Cafe)
Yo (Excuse Me Miss) [Mixtape Mix] (featuring Jay-Z & Pharrell)
Yo (Excuse Me Miss) [South Rakkas Reggaeton Mix]
Yo (Excuse Me Miss) [Johnny Douglas Remix]
Yo (Excuse Me Miss) [ Jacquees remix]

The song has been sampled and reworked in Auburn's "No" and Lil Mosey's "Greet Her".

Charts

Weekly charts

Year-end charts

Certifications

References 

2005 songs
2006 singles
Chris Brown songs
Songs written by Johntá Austin
Songs written by Vidal Davis
Songs written by Andre Harris
Song recordings produced by Dre & Vidal
Music videos directed by Erik White
Jive Records singles